The men's tournament was held from 26 June–1 July 2011 at the Medina Leisure Centre, Newport and Cowes High School, Cowes.

Format
The 11 teams were split into four groups, three contain of three while one group just had two teams. The 2 best teams of each group advanced to the quarterfinals, while the last team of Group A–C played for places 9–11.

Teams

Group stage

Group A

Group B

Group C

Group D

Placement group

Knockout stage

5th place bracket

Quarterfinals

5th–8th place semifinals

Seventh place game

Fifth place game

Semifinals

Bronze medal game

Gold medal game

References

Basketball at the 2011 Island Games